Ken Ngwa (Ken Ngwa) is a Cameroonian American Director. Born on July 30, 1983 in Bangui, Central African Republic. He emigrated to the United States at the age of 7 and was raised in the Chicago suburb of Calumet City. Raised within an immigrant enclave the South Side of Chicago fostered his development and interest in the broader world. He graduated from Columbia College in 2006 with a degree in journalism. He began his foray into the arts as an uncredited crew member on Big Brother Africa 2013. In 2014, he wrote and produced an independent film titled Scam Republique. The film was shot entirely in Yaounde, Cameroon by a multi-national film crew. The film was produced in conjunction with Benzin Films (Brazil). The ensemble crew was made up of artists from the United States, Cameroon and Brazil. Ngwa directed the short documentary Le Circuit: A Different Diaspora. A documentary on Third Culture artists living and creating in Hollywood. The motion picture Nature Boy (scheduled 2022) was filmed in Chicago over the summer of 2018. Nature Boy is an Afro-surrealist reimagining of growing up in inner city Chicago from an African viewpoint. He founded Sun People Productions, in 2017. The company focuses on  highlighting underrepresented communities around the world through digital media.  His films and music videos have been featured in the New York Hip Hop Film Festival, The African Film Festival, & The Queens Underground Film Festival. In 2020 he directed the music video "New Bosses Remix" by artists 2nd Generation WU the video features multi-platinum Grammy Award-winning rapper Method Man. He has also worked with Cornelius Records, reggae artist Pinchers Jr. Capitol Records, Wallie the Sensei. 2021, he directed a short by Matt James, actor and businessman as well as the first Black contestant from The Bachelor.

External links
https://www.okayplayer.com/video/2nd-generation-wu-generation-remix.html
https://ventsmagazine.com/2020/04/20/2nd-generation-wu-collaborates-with-method-man-in-space-for-new-generation-remix-official-video/
https://earmilk.com/2020/04/14/2nd-generation-wu-team-up-with-method-man-on-new-generation-remix/
https://hiphopfilmfestival.org/projects/scam-republic/
 https://sunpeopleproductions.com/

Living people
1983 births